The women's tournament of the 2018 FIBA 3x3 World Cup hosted in Bocaue, Philippines, was contested by 20 teams.

Participating teams
All FIBA continental zones except for FIBA Oceania are represented by at least one team. The top 20 teams, including the hosts, based on the FIBA National Federation ranking qualified for the tournament.

FIBA announced the composition of the pools on April 10, 2018. There was no draw made and the teams were seeded based on their FIBA National Federation rankings as of the April 1, 2018 cut-off date. The top one, two, three, and four teams were placed at the top of Pools A, B, C, and D respectively. The next four teams are placed in reversed order with the top five team placed as the second team of Pool D and the top eight team designated as the second team of Pool A. The remaining eight teams are seeded in a similar manner with the last ranked team placed as the last team of Pool A.

Venezuela was replaced by Indonesia.

FIBA Asia (7)
  (1)
  (9)
  (10)
  (15)
  (16)
  (17)
  (20) (hosts)

FIBA Africa (1)
  (19)

FIBA Americas (2)
 
  (13)
  (18)

FIBA Europe (10)
  (2)
  (3)
  (4) 
  (5)
  (6)
  (7)
  (8)
  (11)
  (12)
  (14)

Players

Main tournament

Preliminary round

Pool A

Pool B

Pool C

Pool D

Knockout stage

Final standings

Individual contests

Skills contest

Shoot-out contest

Winners

Main tournament

Individual awards

|-style="vertical-align: top;"
|
Contest winners
Skills: 
Shoot-out (Mixed): 
|
Other
MVP

Mythical Three

|}

References

External links
Official website

Women's
FIBA Women's 3x3 World Cup
3x3 World Cup
International women's basketball competitions hosted by the Philippines
Bask